Vincent Baestaens (born 18 June 1989 in Ekeren) is a Belgian cyclo-cross and road cyclist, who currently rides for UCI Cyclo-cross team Deschacht–Group Hens–Containers Maes.

Major results

2006–2007
 1st  UEC European Junior Championships
2008–2009
 1st  National Under-23 Championships
 Under-23 Gazet van Antwerpen
1st Loenhout
2nd Baal
2010–2011
 UCI Under-23 World Cup
1st Koksijde
1st Kalmthout
 Under-23 Superprestige
1st Gavere
1st Hoogstraten
 1st Under-23 Aigle
2011–2012
 1st Villarcayo
2012-2013
 3rd Fae' di Oderzo
2014–2015
 1st Podbrezová
 1st Ternitz
 1st Rossano Veneto
 1st Fae' di Oderzo
 1st Differdange
 2nd Rucphen
 3rd Heerlen
2015–2016
 1st Rochester
 Toi Toi Cup
2nd Tábor
 Soudal Classics
3rd Leuven
2016–2017
 1st Muskiz
 2nd Zonnebeke
2017–2018
 1st Karrantza
 2nd Fae' di Oderzo
 2nd Lutterbach
 3rd Waterloo
2018–2019
 EKZ CrossTour
1st Aigle
 Toi Toi Cup
1st Uničov
 SMP Master Cross
1st Fae' di Oderzo
 1st Manlleu
 1st Elorrio
 2nd Laudio
 2nd Poprad
2019–2020
 Toi Toi Cup
1st Slaný
 EKZ CrossTour
1st Aigle
 SMP Master Cross
1st Fae' di Oderzo
 1st Rochester I
 2nd Iowa City III
2020–2021
 EKZ CrossTour
2nd Bern
2nd Baden
2021–2022
 USCX Series
1st Rochester I
1st Rochester II
1st Baltimore I
1st Baltimore II
1st Iowa City I
 2nd Jablines
2022–2023
 USCX Series
1st Roanoke I
1st Roanoke II
1st Rochester I
1st Rochester II
1st Baltimore I
2nd Baltimore II

References

External links

1989 births
Living people
Belgian male cyclists
Cyclists from Antwerp
People from Ekeren
Cyclo-cross cyclists